Peter Müller (born 6 October 1957) is a former World Cup alpine ski racer from Switzerland.

Career
A world champion in 1987 in the downhill, Müller was a silver medalist the downhill in two world championships (1985 and 1989) and two Olympic games (1984 and 1988).

Müller won the World Cup season title in the downhill in 1979, 1980, and 1982 (tied with Steve Podborski of Canada).  Müller finished second in the World Cup downhill standings in 1985, 1986, and 1987. His best finish in the overall standings was fourth, which he achieved three times.

Müller retired from international competition following the 1992 season with 24 World Cup victories (19 downhill, 2 Super-G, 3 combined). Afterwards he competed in orienteering.

World Cup results

Season standings

Season titles

^ tie with Steve Podborski of Canada

Individual races
 24 wins – (19 DH, 2 SG, 3 K)
 51 podiums – (41 DH, 3 SG, 7 K)

See also
 List of FIS Alpine Ski World Cup men's race winners

References

External links

Video
 YouTube video – Peter Müller – victory at Wengen – age 22 – January 1980

1957 births
Living people
People from Adliswil
Swiss male alpine skiers
Alpine skiers at the 1980 Winter Olympics
Alpine skiers at the 1984 Winter Olympics
Alpine skiers at the 1988 Winter Olympics
Olympic alpine skiers of Switzerland
Olympic medalists in alpine skiing
Olympic silver medalists for Switzerland
FIS Alpine Ski World Cup champions
Medalists at the 1984 Winter Olympics
Medalists at the 1988 Winter Olympics
Sportspeople from the canton of Zürich
20th-century Swiss people